Elizabeth Chomko (born 1981) is an  American playwright, film director, screenwriter and actress best known for the film What They Had.

Early life
Chomko grew up in Chicago, Minnesota and Wisconsin. Her family moved to Belgium when she was a freshman in high school. They later moved to California and she attended Los Altos High School in Los Altos, acting in the Broken Box Theatre Company and graduating in 1999. She attended American University, earning degrees in theater and philosophy with a specialty in gender studies.

Career
After graduating, Chomko performed at theatres in Washington D.C. and was a resident company member at Rorschach Theatre Company. Her play Yield! was produced in the Page To Stage Festival at The Kennedy Center. She made her first screen appearance in 2008, and has appeared in CSI: Crime Scene Investigation and The Mentalist, and had  recurring roles on USA's Common Law and FX's Terriers.

She was invited to the Sundance Institute in 2016 and came to prominence in 2018 after writing and directing the drama film What They Had; this screenplay had earned her the Nicholl Fellowship in 2015.

Personal life
Chomko married TV personality and wood artist Jay Montepare in 2011; the couple live in Los Angeles.

References

External links
 

American film actresses
1981 births
American women film directors
American television actresses
Actresses from Chicago
Living people
21st-century American women